George Guy may refer to:

 Buddy Guy (born 1936), American blues guitarist and singer
 George Guy (trade unionist) (1918–2005), British trade unionist